The surname Fodor may refer to the following notable people:

 Benjamin Fodor alias Phoenix Jones (born 1988), American real-life superhero
 Carel Anton Fodor (1768–1846), Dutch conductor and composer
 Carl Fodor (born 1963), American football player
 Caros Fodor (born 1984), American mixed martial artist
 Eugene Fodor (writer) (1905–1991), American writer of travel literature, founder of Fodor's travel guides
 Eugene Fodor (violinist) (1950–2011), American violin virtuoso
 Florin Fodor (born 1974), Romanian who has repeatedly attempted to enter Canada illegally
 Gábor Fodor (chemist) (1915–2000), chemist
 Gábor Fodor (politician) (born 1962), liberal politician
 Géza Fodor (philosopher) (1943–2008), art critic, dramaturge
 Géza Fodor (mathematician) (1927–1977), mathematician, the namesake of Fodor's lemma
 István Fodor (born 1945), Hungarian former politician, former Speaker of the National Assembly of Hungary
 Janet Dean Fodor (born 1942), American psycholinguist
 Jerry Fodor (1935–2017), American author and philosopher
 Josef von Fodor (1843–1901), Hungarian professor of hygiene
 Lajos Fodor (born 1947), Hungarian colonel general and diplomat, former Chief of the General Staff of the Armed Forces of the Republic of Hungary
 Marcel Fodor (1890–1977), Hungarian-American foreign correspondent, journalist, and author
 Răzvan Fodor (born 1975), Romanian singer

See also
 Fodor's, a travel and tourism publisher

Hungarian-language surnames
Romanian-language surnames